Chrysozephyrus surioia, the cerulean hairstreak, is a small butterfly found in India that belongs to the lycaenids or blues family.

Taxonomy
The butterfly was previously classified as Thecla surioia Doubleday.

Range
The butterfly occurs in India from Assam to Manipur and in the Kachin Hills of Myanmar.

See also
List of butterflies of India (Lycaenidae)

Cited references

References
  
 
 
 

Chrysozephyrus
Butterflies of Asia